David James Bamber (born 19 September 1954) is an English actor. He has worked in television and theatre. He is an Associate of the Royal Academy of Dramatic Art.

Early years
Bamber was born in Walkden, Lancashire. By September 1973, he was at the Manchester Youth Theatre, playing Pandarus in Troilus and Cressida. Bamber studied drama at Bristol University, continuing his training at RADA where he won the Gold Medal in 1979.

Career
Bamber has worked on many British television series, mini-series and TV films. He appeared in the BBC adaptations of Hanif Kureishi's The Buddha of Suburbia and Jane Austen's Pride and Prejudice, in which he portrayed the Bennets' clergyman cousin, Mr. Collins. He also played the part of a junior treasury minister and stamp collecting enthusiast, Julian Whitaker, in an episode of The New Statesman, in which Alan frames Whitaker and forces his resignation. In 1997 he starred as Eric Slatt in two series of Steven Moffat's Chalk, contributing to the audio commentaries for the DVD release in 2008. His best known international television role to date was his 2005–2007 role as Marcus Tullius Cicero in the HBO/BBC2 original television series, Rome. In Poirot Series 3: Episode 7 "The Double Clue," he plays the effete middleman to a jewellery collector who is robbed. Bamber also played Adolf Hitler in Bryan Singer's film, Valkyrie. Most recently he played the part of Noel in the Sky Atlantic series Camping, and Admiral Ramsay in the 2017 film Darkest Hour.

As a stage actor, Bamber won the 1995 Laurence Olivier Award for Best Actor for his performance as Guy in My Night with Reg, a role he reprised in a 1996 BBC television adaptation. His roles as a voice actor include Emperor Constantine in the Doctor Who audio drama, The Council of Nicaea and as Jeremy Longstaff in the 2008 radio series The Way We Live Right Now.

Personal life
Bamber is married to the actress Julia Swift, daughter of actors David Swift and Paula Jacobs.

They have two sons, Theo (1991) and Ethan (1998). Ethan has played cricket for England U19s and Middlesex. The family lives in North London.

Filmography

Film

Television

References

Further reading

External links

1954 births
Living people
Alumni of RADA
Alumni of the University of Bristol
English male film actors
English male musical theatre actors
English male radio actors
English male stage actors
English male television actors
English male voice actors
Laurence Olivier Award winners
People from Walkden
Royal Shakespeare Company members
English male Shakespearean actors
20th-century English male actors
21st-century English male actors
Male actors from Salford